The 2009–10 Colorado Avalanche season was the franchise's 38th season, 31st in the National Hockey League (NHL) and 15th as the Colorado Avalanche.

Off-season
On June 3, 2009, the Avalanche began a complete overhaul of the coaching staff by firing head coach Tony Granato, along with assistants coaches Jacques Cloutier and Dave Barr, goaltending coach Jeff Hackett, assistant to the general manager Michel Goulet and video coordinator PJ DeLuca. Also on June 3, the Avalanche hired Greg Sherman as their new general manager, replacing Francois Giguere, who had been fired in April. On June 4, Joe Sacco was hired to be the new head coach. Before Sacco's hiring, an offer had been made to former Avalanche goaltender Patrick Roy to become head coach, which Roy declined.

Defenceman Adam Foote was named team captain following the retirement of long-time captain Joe Sakic.

Preseason 

|- align="center" bgcolor="#ccffcc"
| 1 || September 17 || Dallas Stars || 1 - 3 || Colorado Avalanche || || Anderson || 1-0-0 || 
|- align="center" bgcolor="#ffbbbb"
| 2 || September 18 || Colorado Avalanche || 2 - 6 || St. Louis Blues || || Weiman || 1-1-0 || 
|- align="center" bgcolor="#ccffcc"
| 3 || September 20 || St. Louis Blues || 1 - 2 || Colorado Avalanche || OT || Budaj || 2-1-0 || 
|- align="center" bgcolor="#ccffcc"
| 4 || September 23 || Los Angeles Kings || 2 - 3 || Colorado Avalanche || || Anderson || 3-1-0 || 
|- align="center" bgcolor="#ffbbbb"
| 5 || September 24 || Colorado Avalanche || 2 - 3 || Dallas Stars || || Budaj || 3-2-0 || 
|- align="center" bgcolor="#ffbbbb"
| 6 || September 26(in Las Vegas) || Colorado Avalanche || 3 - 5 || Los Angeles Kings || || Anderson || 3-3-0 || 
|-

Regular season 
On July 9, 2009, Avalanche captain Joe Sakic announced his retirement from the NHL after 20 seasons. The Avalanche retired Sakic's jersey #19 in a ceremony before the October 1, 2009 home opener of the 2009-10 season. On November 12, 2009, the Avalanche unveiled a new third jersey.

On February 10, 2010, Kyle Cumiskey scored just 9 seconds into the overtime period to give the Avalanche a 4-3 home win over the Atlanta Thrashers. It would prove to be the fastest overtime goal scored during the 2009-10 NHL regular season.

Divisional standings

Conference standings

Game log 

|- align="center" bgcolor=#CCFFCC
| 1 || October 1 || San Jose Sharks || 2 – 5 || Colorado Avalanche || || Anderson || 18,007 || 1–0–0 || 2 || 
|- align="center" bgcolor=#CCFFCC
| 2 || October 3 || Vancouver Canucks || 0 – 3 || Colorado Avalanche || || Anderson || 13,416 || 2–0–0 || 4 || 
|- align="center" bgcolor=#FFBBBB
| 3 || October 8 || Colorado Avalanche || 2 - 3 || Nashville Predators || || Anderson || 14,797 || 2-1-0 || 4 || 
|- align="center" bgcolor=white
| 4 || October 10 || Colorado Avalanche || 3 - 4 || Chicago Blackhawks || SO || Anderson || 20,655 || 2-1-1 || 5 || 
|- align="center" bgcolor=#CCFFCC
| 5 || October 12 || Colorado Avalanche || 4 - 3 || Boston Bruins || || Anderson || 16,393 || 3-1-1 || 7 || 
|- align="center" bgcolor=#CCFFCC
| 6 || October 13 || Colorado Avalanche || 4 - 1 || Toronto Maple Leafs || || Anderson || 19,148 || 4-1-1 || 9 || 
|- align="center" bgcolor=#CCFFCC
| 7 || October 15 || Colorado Avalanche || 3 - 2 || Montreal Canadiens || || Anderson || 21,273 || 5-1-1 || 11 || 
|- align="center" bgcolor=#CCFFCC
| 8 || October 17 || Colorado Avalanche || 4 - 3 || Detroit Red Wings || SO || Anderson || 19,763 || 6-1-1 || 13 || 
|- align="center" bgcolor=white
| 9 || October 21 || Colorado Avalanche || 2 - 3 || Minnesota Wild || SO || Anderson || 18,175 || 6-1-2 || 14 || 
|- align="center" bgcolor=#CCFFCC
| 10 || October 23 || Carolina Hurricanes || 4 - 5 || Colorado Avalanche || || Anderson || 13,673 || 7-1-2 || 16 || 
|- align="center" bgcolor=#CCFFCC
| 11 || October 24 || Detroit Red Wings || 1 - 3 || Colorado Avalanche || ||Anderson || 17,690 || 8-1-2 || 18 || 
|- align="center" bgcolor=#CCFFCC
| 12 || October 27 || Colorado Avalanche || 3 - 0 || Edmonton Oilers || || Anderson || 16,839 || 9-1-2 || 20 || 
|- align="center" bgcolor=#CCFFCC
| 13 || October 28 || Colorado Avalanche || 3 - 2 || Calgary Flames || || Anderson || 19,289 || 10-1-2 || 22 || 
|- align="center" bgcolor=#FFBBBB
| 14 || October 30 || Colorado Avalanche || 1 - 3 || San Jose Sharks || || Anderson || 17,562 || 10-2-2 || 22 || 
|-

|- align="center" bgcolor=#FFBBBB
| 15 || November 1 || Colorado Avalanche || 0 - 3 || Vancouver Canucks || || Anderson || 18,810 || 10-3-2 || 22 || 
|- align="center" bgcolor=#CCFFCC
| 16 || November 4 || Phoenix Coyotes || 1 - 4 || Colorado Avalanche || || Budaj || 11,012 || 11-3-2 || 24 || 
|- align="center" bgcolor=#CCFFCC
| 17 || November 6 || Chicago Blackhawks || 3 - 4 || Colorado Avalanche || SO || Anderson || 15,616 || 12-3-2 || 26 || 
|- align="center" bgcolor=#FFBBBB
| 18 || November 8 || Edmonton Oilers || 5 - 3 || Colorado Avalanche || || Anderson || 12,118 || 12-4-2 || 26 || 
|- align="center" bgcolor="white"
| 19 || November 11 || Colorado Avalanche || 2 - 3 || Chicago Blackhawks ||SO ||Anderson || 20,879 || 12-4-3 ||27 || 
|- align="center" bgcolor=#FFBBBB
| 20 || November 14 || Vancouver Canucks || 8 - 2 || Colorado Avalanche || || Anderson || 15,823 || 12-5-3 || 27 || 
|- align="center" bgcolor=#CCFFCC
| 21 || November 17 || Colorado Avalanche || 3 - 2 || Calgary Flames || || Anderson || 19,289 || 13-5-3 || 29 || 
|- align="center" bgcolor=#FFBBBB
| 22 || November 18 || Colorado Avalanche || 4 - 6 || Edmonton Oilers || || Budaj || 16,839 || 13-6-3 || 29 || 
|- align="center" bgcolor=#FFBBBB
| 23 || November 20 || Colorado Avalanche || 2 - 5 || Vancouver Canucks || || Anderson || 18,810 || 13-7-3 || 29 || 
|- align="center" bgcolor=#CCFFCC
| 24 || November 23 || Philadelphia Flyers || 4 - 5 || Colorado Avalanche || || Anderson || 13,281 || 14-7-3 || 31 || 
|- align="center" bgcolor="white
| 25 || November 25 || Nashville Predators || 4 - 3 || Colorado Avalanche || OT || Anderson || 12,356 || 14-7-4 || 32 || 
|- align="center" bgcolor=#FFBBBB
| 26 || November 27 || Colorado Avalanche || 3 - 5 || Minnesota Wild || || Anderson || 18,365 || 14-8-4 || 32 || 
|- align="center" bgcolor="white"
| 27 || November 28 || Minnesota Wild || 3 - 2 || Colorado Avalanche || SO || Anderson || 15,303 || 14-8-5 || 33 || 
|- align="center" bgcolor=#CCFFCC
| 28 || November 30 || Colorado Avalanche || 3 - 0 || Tampa Bay Lightning || || Anderson || 12,214 || 15-8-5 || 35 || 
|-

|- align="center" bgcolor="white"
| 29 || December 2 || Colorado Avalanche || 5 - 6 || Florida Panthers || SO || Anderson || 12,403 || 15-8-6 || 36 || 
|- align="center" bgcolor=#FFBBBB
| 30 || December 3 || Colorado Avalanche || 1 - 4 || Pittsburgh Penguins || || Budaj || 16,968 || 15-9-6 || 36 || 
|- align="center" bgcolor=#CCFFCC
| 31 || December 5 || Colorado Avalanche || 3 - 2 || Columbus Blue Jackets || || Budaj || 14,909 || 16-9-6 || 38 || 
|- align="center" bgcolor=#CCFFCC
| 32 || December 7 || Colorado Avalanche || 4 - 0 || St. Louis Blues || || Budaj || 19,150 || 17-9-6 || 40 || 
|- align="center" bgcolor=#FFBBBB
| 33 || December 9 || Minnesota Wild || 1 - 0 || Colorado Avalanche || ||Budaj || 11,435 || 17-10-6 || 40 || 
|- align="center" bgcolor=#CCFFCC
| 34 || December 11 || Tampa Bay Lightning || 1 - 2 || Colorado Avalanche || SO || Anderson || 12,188 || 18-10-6 || 42 || 
|- align="center" bgcolor=#CCFFCC
| 35 || December 13 || Calgary Flames || 2 - 3 || Colorado Avalanche || || Anderson || 11,448 || 19-10-6 || 44 || 
|- align="center" bgcolor=#FFBBBB
| 36 || December 15 || Washington Capitals || 6 - 1 || Colorado Avalanche || || Anderson || 14,172 || 19-11-6 || 44 || 
|- align="center" bgcolor=#CCFFCC
| 37 || December 19 || Columbus Blue Jackets || 2 - 5 || Colorado Avalanche || || Anderson || 11,782 || 20-11-6 || 46 || 
|- align="center" bgcolor=#CCFFCC
| 38 || December 21 || Colorado Avalanche || 4 - 3 || Minnesota Wild || || Anderson || 18,244 || 21-11-6 || 48 || 
|- align="center" bgcolor=#FFBBBB
| 39 || December 22 || Anaheim Ducks || 4 - 2 || Colorado Avalanche || || Anderson || 12,171 || 21-12-6 || 48 || 
|- align="center" bgcolor=#CCFFCC
| 40 || December 26 || Dallas Stars || 1 - 4 || Colorado Avalanche || || Budaj || 18,007 || 22-12-6 || 50 || 
|- align="center" bgcolor=#CCFFCC
| 41 || December 30 || Colorado Avalanche || 4 - 3 || Ottawa Senators || || Anderson || 17,823 || 23-12-6 || 52 || 
|- align="center" bgcolor=#FFBBBB
| 42 || December 31 || Colorado Avalanche || 2 - 4 || Detroit Red Wings || || Anderson || 20,066 || 23-13-6  || 52 || 
|-

|- align="center" bgcolor=#CCFFCC
| 43 || January 2 || Colorado Avalanche || 3 - 2 || Columbus Blue Jackets || || Anderson || 17,371 || 24-13-6 || 54 || 
|- align="center" bgcolor=#FFBBBB
| 44 || January 6 || New York Islanders || 3 - 2 || Colorado Avalanche || || Anderson || 13,898 || 24-14-6 || 54 || 
|- align="center" bgcolor=#FFBBBB
| 45 || January 8 || Colorado Avalanche || 1 - 2 || Carolina Hurricanes || || Budaj || 14,071 || 24-15-6 || 54 || 
|- align="center" bgcolor=#CCFFCC
| 46 || January 9 || Colorado Avalanche || 4 - 3 || Buffalo Sabres || SO || Anderson || 18,690 || 25-15-6 || 56 || 
|- align="center" bgcolor=#CCFFCC
| 47 || January 11 || Colorado Avalanche || 3 - 2  || Calgary Flames || SO || Anderson || 19,289 || 26-15-6 || 58  || 
|- align="center" bgcolor=#CCFFCC
| 48 || January 16 || New Jersey Devils || 1 - 3  || Colorado Avalanche || || Anderson || 17,816 || 27-15-6 || 60 || 
|- align="center" bgcolor=#CCFFCC
| 49 || January 18 || Edmonton Oilers || 0 - 6 || Colorado Avalanche || || Anderson || 11,232 || 28-15-6 || 62 || 
|- align="center" bgcolor=#CCFFCC
| 50 || January 22 || Nashville Predators || 1 - 2 || Colorado Avalanche || || Anderson || 12,452 || 29-15-6 || 64 || 
|- align="center" bgcolor=#CCFFCC
| 51 || January 24 || Dallas Stars || 0 - 4 || Colorado Avalanche || || Anderson || 11,741 || 30-15-6 || 66 || 
|- align="center" bgcolor=#FFBBBB
| 52 || January 28 || Minnesota Wild || 1 - 0 || Colorado Avalanche || || Anderson || 11,597 || 30-16-6 || 66 || 
|- align="center" bgcolor=#FFBBBB
| 53 || January 29 || Colorado Avalanche || 2 - 3 || Dallas Stars || || Anderson || 18,532 || 30-17-6 || 66 || 
|- align="center" bgcolor=#FFBBBB
| 54 || January 31 || New York Rangers || 3 - 1 || Colorado Avalanche || || Anderson || 15,264 || 30-18-6 || 66 || 
|-

|- align="center" bgcolor=#CCFFCC
| 55 || February 2 || Columbus Blue Jackets || 1 - 5 || Colorado Avalanche || || Anderson || 11,213 || 31-18-6 || 68 || 
|- align="center" bgcolor=#FFBBBB
| 56 || February 4 || Colorado Avalanche || 3 - 5 || Nashville Predators || || Anderson || 17,113 || 31-19-6 || 68 || 
|- align="center" bgcolor=#CCFFCC
| 57 || February 6 || Edmonton Oilers || 0 - 3 || Colorado Avalanche || || Anderson || 16,571 || 32-18-6 || 70 || 
|- align="center" bgcolor=#CCFFCC
| 58 || February 8 || St. Louis Blues || 2 - 5 || Colorado Avalanche || || Anderson || 11,261 || 33-18-6 || 72 || 
|- align="center" bgcolor=#CCFFCC
| 59 || February 10 || Atlanta Thrashers || 3 - 4 || Colorado Avalanche || OT || Anderson || 11,644 || 34-18-6 || 74 || 
|- align="center" bgcolor=#CCFFCC
| 60 || February 12 || Phoenix Coyotes || 1 - 2 || Colorado Avalanche || || Anderson || 14,129 || 35-18-6 || 76 || 
|- align="center" bgcolor=#FFBBBB
| 61 || February 13 || Colorado Avalanche || 0 - 3 || Los Angeles Kings|| || Anderson || 18,118 || 35-20-6 || 76 || 
|-

|- align="center" bgcolor=#FFBBBB
| 62 || March 1 || Detroit Red Wings || 3 - 2 || Colorado Avalanche || || Anderson || 18,007 || 35-21-6 || 76 || 
|- align="center" bgcolor=#CCFFCC
| 63 || March 3 || Colorado Avalanche || 4 - 3 || Anaheim Ducks || || Anderson || 14,840 || 36-20-6 || 78 || 
|- align="center" bgcolor=#FFBBBB
| 64 || March 4 || Colorado Avalanche || 1 - 3 || Phoenix Coyotes || || Anderson || 12,426 || 36-22-6 || 78 || 
|- align="center" bgcolor=#CCFFCC
| 65 || March 6 || St. Louis Blues || 3 - 7 || Colorado Avalanche || || Anderson || 18,007 || 37-21-6 || 80 || 
|- align="center" bgcolor=#FFBBBB
| 66 || March 9 || Vancouver Canucks || 6 - 4 || Colorado Avalanche || || Anderson || 12,861 || 37-23-6 || 80 || 
|- align="center" bgcolor=#CCFFCC
| 67 || March 11 || Florida Panthers || 0 - 3 || Colorado Avalanche || || Anderson || 11,458 || 38-22-6 || 82 || 
|- align="center" bgcolor=#CCFFCC
| 68 || March 14 || Colorado Avalanche || 5 - 3 || Dallas Stars || || Anderson || 16,246 || 39-22-6 || 84 || 
|- align="center" bgcolor=#CCFFCC
| 69 || March 16 || Colorado Avalanche || 5 - 3 || St. Louis Blues || || Budaj || 19,150 || 40-22-6 || 86 || 
|- align="center" bgcolor=#FFBBBB
| 70 || March 17 || Calgary Flames || 3 - 2 || Colorado Avalanche || || Anderson || 12,770 || 40-24-6 || 86 || 
|- align="center" bgcolor=#FFBBBB
| 71 || March 21 || Colorado Avalanche || 2 - 5 || Anaheim Ducks || || Anderson || 15,528 || 40-25-6 || 86 || 
|- align="center" bgcolor="white"
| 72 || March 22 || Colorado Avalanche || 3 - 4 || Los Angeles Kings || OT || Anderson || 17,845 || 40-24-7 || 87 || 
|- align="center" bgcolor=#CCFFCC
| 73 || March 24 || Los Angeles Kings || 3 - 4 || Colorado Avalanche || SO || Anderson || 13,667 || 41-24-7 || 89 || 
|- align="center" bgcolor=#FFBBBB
| 74 || March 27 || Colorado Avalanche || 2 - 6 || Phoenix Coyotes || || Anderson || 17,188 || 41-26-7 || 89 || 
|- align="center" bgcolor=#FFBBBB
| 75 || March 28 || Colorado Avalanche || 3 - 4 || San Jose Sharks || || Anderson || 17,562 || 41-27-7 || 89 || 
|- align="center" bgcolor=#FFBBBB
| 76 || March 31 || Anaheim Ducks || 5 - 2 || Colorado Avalanche || || Anderson || 13,862 || 41-28-7 || 89 || 
|-

|- align="center" bgcolor=#FFBBBB
| 77 || April 2 || Calgary Flames || 2 - 1 || Colorado Avalanche || || Anderson || 18,007 || 41-29-7  || 89 || 
|- align="center" bgcolor=#CCFFCC
| 78 || April 4 || San Jose Sharks || 4 - 5 || Colorado Avalanche || OT || Anderson || 12,893 || 42-29-7 || 91 || 
|- align="center" bgcolor=#CCFFCC
| 79 || April 6 || Colorado Avalanche || 4 - 3 || Vancouver Canucks || SO || Anderson || 18,810 || 43-29-7 || 93 || 
|- align="center" bgcolor="white"
| 80 || April 7 || Colorado Avalanche || 4 - 5 || Edmonton Oilers || OT || Budaj || 16,839 || 43-29-8 || 94 || 
|- align="center" bgcolor=#FFBBBB
| 81 || April 9 || Chicago Blackhawks || 5 - 2 || Colorado Avalanche ||  || Budaj || 16,327 || 43-30-8 || 94 || 
|- align="center" bgcolor="white"
| 82 || April 11 || Los Angeles Kings || 2 - 1 || Colorado Avalanche || OT || Anderson || 15,674 || 43-30-9 || 95 || 
|-

Playoffs

Key:  Win  Loss

|- align=center bgcolor="#ccffcc"
| 1 || April 14 || Colorado Avalanche || 2 - 1 || San Jose Sharks || || Anderson || 17,562 || Avalanche lead 1-0 || 
|- align="center" bgcolor="#ffbbbb"
| 2 || April 16 || Colorado Avalanche || 5 - 6 || San Jose Sharks || OT || Anderson || 17,562 || Series tied 1-1 || 
|- align="center" bgcolor="#ccffcc"
| 3 || April 18 || San Jose Sharks || 0 - 1 || Colorado Avalanche || OT || Anderson || 18,007 || Avalanche lead 2-1 || 
|- align="center" bgcolor="#ffbbbb"
| 4 || April 20 || San Jose Sharks || 2 - 1 || Colorado Avalanche || OT || Anderson || 18,007 || Series tied 2-2 || 
|- align="center" bgcolor="#ffbbbb"
| 5 || April 22 || Colorado Avalanche || 0 - 5 || San Jose Sharks || || Anderson || 17,562 || Sharks lead 3-2 || 
|- align="center" bgcolor="#ffbbbb"
| 6 || April 24 || San Jose Sharks || 5 - 2 || Colorado Avalanche || || Anderson || 18,007 || Sharks win series 4-2 || 
|-

Player statistics

Skaters
Note: GP = Games played; G = Goals; A = Assists; Pts = Points; +/− = Plus/minus; PIM = Penalty minutes

Goaltenders
Note: GP = Games played; TOI = Time on ice (minutes); W = Wins; L = Losses; OT = Overtime losses; GA = Goals against; GAA= Goals against average; SA= Shots against; Sv% = Save percentage; SO= Shutouts; G= Goals; A= Assists; PIM= Penalties in minutes

†Denotes player spent time with another team before joining Avalanche. Stats reflect time with the Avalanche only.
‡Traded mid-season

Awards and records

Records

Milestones

Awards

Transactions 

The Avalanche were involved in the following transactions during the 2009–10 season.

Trades

Free agents acquired

Free agents lost

Lost via retirement

Player signings

Draft picks 
Colorado had 7 picks at the 2009 NHL Entry Draft in Montreal, Quebec.

Farm teams

Lake Erie Monsters 

The Avalanche's American Hockey League affiliate was the Lake Erie Monsters, based in Cleveland, Ohio.

Johnstown Chiefs 

The Johnstown Chiefs of the ECHL were the Avalanche's second-tier affiliate.

See also

 2009–10 NHL season

External links 
 Colorado Avalanche home page

References 

Colorado Avalanche seasons
C
C
Colorado Avalanche
Colorado Avalanche